Syabru is a traditional Nepalese Himalayan folk dance. It is primarily performed by the people of the Sherpa and Yolmo communities. It is also performed by people of Tamang and other Himalayan communities of Nepal. The dance is performed in every festival as well as in various auspicious events and gathering.

Performance 
The dance is performed in a group. The dance is performed by both men and women. People wear their ethnic clothes while performing the dance. People sing traditional folk songs while moving slowly in a line or a circulus while performing the dance. The songs are often accompanied by traditional instruments such as Tungna.

Preservation 
Alongside various folk dances of Nepal, the popularity of Syabru dance is also being decreased. In order to preserve and promote the dance form, various competitions, workshops and awareness programmes are being conducted. The dance is an essential ritual during the Gyalpo Lhosar celebration.

References 
Nepalese folk dances
Sherpa culture
Dance in Nepal
Himalayan dances
Culture of Koshi Province
Tamang culture
Hyolmo culture